On 2 July 1949 a Douglas DC-3 aircraft departed from Perth, Western Australia for a night flight of  to Carnarvon. It crashed about a mile north of Perth airport and burned for over an hour. At the time, it was the worst civil aviation accident in Western Australia.

The flight 
The aircraft was the airliner Fitzroy, registered VH-MME and operated by MacRobertson Miller Aviation. On 2 July 1949 it was about to conduct the regular passenger service from Perth to Darwin, Northern Territory which departed about 2 am to allow passengers to connect with the twice-weekly Sydney-London flight operated by Qantas. The first stop was to be Carnarvon in Western Australia. On board were three pilots, an air hostess and 14 passengers. The aircraft took off at 2:14 am in driving rain.
The aircraft climbed unusually quickly after it left the runway.

The aircraft crashed in a clear area between huts at the South Guildford housing camp, a former Army camp where 70 huts were being used to house civilians. As a result of the aircraft diving vertically to the ground, the wreckage was mostly confined within an area that was no larger than  square. The aircraft narrowly missed the surrounding huts with wreckage coming to within  of one hut, and within 5 paces of the front verandah of another.

An intense fire erupted inside the fuselage.  The first fire-fighting equipment to reach the site was the fire tender from the airport, crewed by one fireman only.  The fireman laid a foam blanket around the burning wreckage and sprayed foam on the fire. He used all the foam without extinguishing the flames.  Two other fire tenders from neighbouring areas arrived to assist.  It was 90 minutes before the fire was extinguished.

After sunrise, police, firemen and undertakers worked for an hour to remove the bodies of the 18 people killed in the accident.  All the bodies were burned beyond recognition.  Several of the bodies were still sitting in an upright position.  The bodies of the 3 pilots in the cockpit were half-buried under a mass of charred newspaper.  The aircraft was carrying the Perth daily newspaper to towns in the north-west of the state. Police and two officers from the Department of Civil Aviation sifted through the wreckage in the rain, searching for items to help identify the victims and for clues as to the likely cause of the tragedy.

Investigation 
The Department of Civil Aviation immediately appointed a panel of two to investigate the accident. Examination of the wreckage showed that the flaps and undercarriage were retracted and both engines had been producing high power at the time of the crash.  All trim tabs were in typical positions for takeoff and all control cable runs were intact.  Nothing was found in the wreckage to indicate any prior defect or failure that might have caused the aircraft to crash or the pilot to lose control.  The setting of the automatic pilot could not be determined due to destruction of the forward fuselage. The investigation initially focussed on possible failure to remove one of the flight control chocks, defective flight instruments, misuse of the wing flaps, structural failure of the tailplane, defective elevator control system, misuse of the automatic pilot, and incorrect loading.

Control chocks for the left aileron, one elevator and the rudder were found correctly stowed in the remains of the aircraft's rear fuselage compartment.  Searchers were unable to find the chock for the other elevator or the right aileron, either at the crash site or on the ground between the runway and the crash site.  On the morning after the accident an MMA apprentice found the missing elevator chock on the tarmac close to where VH-MME was positioned for an engine test run the previous afternoon. The investigators carried out a flight test on a DC-3 to determine what effect, if any, was caused by installing an aileron chock on the elevator.  They found there was no effect and the presence of the chock did not prevent the pilot having full control of the elevator.

Staff of the Department of Civil Aviation calculated the most likely position of the centre of gravity on the fatal flight and found it was about 3.3% of Mean Aerodynamic Chord behind the rear limit.  They carried out some flight tests in a DC-3 with its centre of gravity 4.7% of MAC behind the rear limit and found there was a loss of longitudinal static stability that made it difficult to trim the aircraft for a constant airspeed but the low-speed flight handling qualities had not deteriorated seriously.  They concluded that the incorrect position of the centre of gravity did not adequately explain the accident and there must have been some other cause, possibly highly unusual. The investigation ended without determining the cause.

Inquest 
In August 1949 the City Coroner, R. P. Rodriguez, conducted an inquest into the deaths of the 18 people on board the aircraft.

A dispatch officer with MacRobertson Miller Aviation observed the aircraft take off normally, then climb to an almost vertical position, roll over and dive vertically towards the ground, twisting as it did so. Written evidence from the aerodrome control officer on duty in the control tower stated that he observed the aircraft turn through 180 degrees as though in a spiral turn or spin.

Some witnesses who lived at the South Guildford housing camp believed one of the aircraft's engines had failed by the time of the crash.  The City Coroner was satisfied both engines were operating normally during the takeoff and up until the time of the impact.

A medical officer conducted post-mortem examinations of the bodies.  He confirmed there was no indication of alcohol in the bodies of any of the pilots.  All on board died of multiple injuries before being burned.

A resident of the housing camp who was one of the first witnesses to arrive at the crash scene told the City Coroner she saw the air hostess in the cockpit, standing beside the pilot.

The City Coroner was satisfied that the aircraft was airworthy and neither MacRobertson Miller Aviation nor the pilot did anything negligent to cause the fatal crash.

Inquiry 
On 28 September 1949 the Minister for Civil Aviation, Arthur Drakeford, announced that a court of inquiry would be held to investigate the accident because the investigation by the Department of Civil Aviation had been unable to determine the exact cause.  Mr Justice Wolff of the Supreme Court of Western Australia was appointed to chair the inquiry. The inquiry commenced on 12 December 1949.

Observations 
The inquiry received evidence from the aerodrome control officer on duty in the control tower at the time of the takeoff.  He observed the aircraft climb at a steeper rate than any airline-operated aircraft he had seen previously.  When the aircraft was at a height of about  the left wing dropped sharply, as if in a stall.  The nose dipped and the aircraft seemed to rotate through 180 degrees before dropping vertically.  A ground engineer also saw the aircraft climb abruptly before it nosed over and twisted twice as it dived to the ground.

Aircraft loading 
The inquiry heard that on 27 June 1949 the Department of Civil Aviation sent a letter to MacRobertson Miller Aviation advising that the methods used by its operational personnel to check the weight and balance of company aircraft did not conform to the appropriate requirements, and that approved methods must be used in the future. In response, the Operations Manager for MacRobertson Miller Aviation sent specific instructions to pilots on 30 June. On 1 July, the day before the accident, the Operations Manager discussed his instructions with the pilots of the accident flight. Staff involved with the loading of aircraft were instructed to use the method of Index Units to check that the centre of gravity of an aircraft was within limits. Freight weighing  was then removed. However, this employee believed the Load Sheet column labelled Index Units was not completed.

The accuracy of statements regarding 1,400 lb was challenged.

Control chocks 
The inquiry heard that the first officer had been unable to find all the control chocks normally used to lock the control surfaces on the aircraft while it was parked.  There were concerns that one of the aircraft's control chocks might have been left in position instead of being removed before takeoff. The inquiry heard that all chocks were eventually accounted for. There was also a concern that one of the aileron chocks might have been inadvertently inserted in the elevator circuit.  Chief Inspector James Harper told the inquiry that he made some test flights in a DC-3 aircraft in a similar configuration to the Fitzroy on the accident flight.  One test showed that the DC-3 could be flown satisfactorily even with an aileron chock in the elevator circuit.  Harper was satisfied the aircraft did not take off with the elevator locked.

Pilot competency 
The pilot in command of the aircraft on the accident flight was Captain William Norman.  Captain Cyril Kleinig, an approved checking pilot with MacRobertson Miller Aviation, gave evidence to the inquiry.  He had flown with Captain Norman on many occasions and described him as competent. A pilot who had flown the Fitzroy to Carnarvon and return the day before the accident told the inquiry the aircraft had behaved normally.  He also said he had flown with Captain Norman many times and found him to be careful and competent, and more meticulous than most in performing his cockpit drills.

Air hostess 
Two residents of the housing camp who were among the first to arrive at the crash scene told the inquiry they could see two bodies in the wreckage of the cockpit – a male and a female, both wearing uniform, so they presumed the bodies were those of the pilot and air hostess.  One described the female as having fairly long blonde hair. The superintendent of air navigation and safety in the western region of the Department of Civil Aviation said the bodies of the pilot and first officer were found in their correct seats in the cockpit.  Particular attention was paid to the body found closest to the rear of the cabin, a few feet (a metre) forward of the hostess's seat.  The body was that of a female. Another witness was an employee of MacRobertson Miller Aviation who raced from the airport to the scene of the crash.  He contradicted the evidence that the body of a woman could be seen in the cockpit.  He told the inquiry the air hostess had red hair.

Irregularities 
The inquiry exposed certain irregularities in MacRobertson Miller Aviation's operations.  These irregularities centred on the loading of aircraft, proper completion of Load Sheets, and administrative methods.

Counsels' summaries 
The Department of Civil Aviation was represented by Henry Winneke. Mr Winneke suggested to the inquiry that the immediate cause of the accident was that the pilot lost flying control of the aircraft.  He said the reason for this loss of control was unknown although incorrect loading of the aircraft may have contributed.  He acknowledged the excellent work done by the Department's accident investigators in attempting to determine the cause. George Pape, counsel representing MacRobertson Miller Aviation, warned against speculating on what might have caused the crash and urged the court to make an explicit finding that loading of the aircraft was not a possible factor contributing to the cause of the crash.

The inquiry sat for seven days and adjourned on Wednesday 21 December 1949.

Report and findings
The report and findings of the inquiry were not released until 8 March 1950 when the new Minister for Civil Aviation, Thomas White, tabled them in the House of Representatives.  The report confirmed that the crash occurred because the aircraft stalled and the pilots were unable to regain control.  However, the evidence was not sufficient to allow determination of what caused the stall. The report conceded that over-loading of the aircraft's rear baggage compartment may have contributed to the stall.

The inquiry acknowledged that the operator, MacRobertson Miller Aviation, had distributed instructions about aircraft loading to its pilots on 30 June but considered more should have been done. On the night of the accident the pilot in command had not checked the loading calculations performed by the two men responsible for loading the aircraft, as he was required to do, although the inquiry acknowledged there was insufficient evidence to conclude that the pilot in command was responsible for the accident.  The inquiry considered the man responsible for loading the rear baggage compartment possessed inadequate knowledge of aircraft loading and had been untruthful.  He had invented his story to hide his over-loading of the compartment.

The inquiry was critical of the operator and the Department of Civil Aviation. In particular, it was critical of the operator's poor standards of maintenance of aircraft instruments.  For this reason, the inquiry recommended the operator's airline licence should be suspended or cancelled.  It also considered the Department should have made more checks of the operator's methods and record keeping.  The Minister declined to take action against the operator, saying its maintenance record keeping had improved significantly since the accident.  He also cited the hardship that would be inflicted on many remote communities in Western Australia if the operator's airline licence were to be suspended or cancelled.  The Minister said his Department would be extra vigilant towards the operator but conceded there were limits to what could be done without significant increases in staff numbers.
 
The inquiry was also critical of the lack of qualifications and experience of the pilot in command, the late Captain Norman.  It said Norman should not have been promoted to captain, and evidence from Captain Kleinig in support of Captain Norman was worthless.  It recommended that promotion of a pilot to Captain of an airliner should be at the discretion of the Department of Civil Aviation, and that the Department should take account of all records and reports of tests relating to the applicant.

The Managing-Director of MacRobertson Miller Aviation, Mr E.C. Gare, rejected claims of incorrect loading on the night of the accident.  He also defended Captain Norman, saying he had 3,500 hours flying experience and an unblemished record.

Aircraft 
The aircraft was constructed as a Douglas C-47A-20-DL transport aircraft with a Douglas serial number 9350.  It was completed in April 1943 and assigned the military serial number 42-23488.  It was delivered to the US Army Air Force in Brisbane in May 1943.

In July 1946, it was acquired by MacRobertson Miller Aviation and ferried from the Philippines to Perth, where it was converted from a military C-47 to a civil DC-3 with seating for 21 passengers. It was registered by MacRobertson Miller Aviation in March 1947 and named Fitzroy.

See also 
 
  
 List of disasters in Australia by death toll
 List of accidents and incidents involving commercial aircraft
 List of accidents and incidents involving airliners by location

Notes

References

Bibliography
 Fyshwick, Australia. pp. 200.

External links 
 Aviation Safety Network

Aviation accidents and incidents in Western Australia
Aviation accidents and incidents in 1949
Accidents and incidents involving the Douglas DC-3
Disasters in Western Australia
MacRobertson Miller Airlines accidents and incidents
1949 in Australia
Guildford, Western Australia
July 1949 events in Australia
1940s in Perth, Western Australia